In espionage, a field agent is an agent who works in the field as opposed to one who operates at the office or headquarters. A field agent can work alone or in a group but usually has a case officer who is in charge.

Field agents can be undercover, and travel using fake passports that may be under the name of a front organization or shell corporation.

Field agents are often present in fiction, though their duties and actions can be quite different in reality.

See also
Espionage
Agent handling
Double agent
Special agent
Non-official cover (NOC)

References

Spies by role